Samuel Chase (1789—August 3, 1838) was an American lawyer from Otsego County, New York. He represented New York in the U.S. House for one term.

Biography
Chase was born in Cooperstown, New York in 1789. He was educated locally, studied law, and was admitted to the bar in 1815.  In 1818, he studied at the Litchfield Law School.

In addition to practicing law in Richfield, Chase was active in other business ventures; he was part-owner of a hotel and tavern, and was one of the original incorporators of the Otsego County Bank.  He held various positions in local and county government, including postmaster of Richfield and the judicial position of Master in Chancery.  From 1821 to 1829 he was District Attorney of Otsego County.

In 1826, Chase was elected to the 20th Congress as a supporter of John Quincy Adams.  He served one term, 1827 to 1829, after which he returned to his Otsego County law practice.

Death and burial
Chase died in Richfield on August 3, 1838, and was buried at Lakeview Cemetery in Richfield.  Chase's grave marker indicates that he died in 1839; this is clearly in error, since contemporary newspaper accounts and the probate process for his estate give his year of death as 1838.

Family
In 1828, Chase married in Washington, DC Mary Frances Whetcroft, the daughter of William Whetcroft and Anne Winchester Whetcroft of Annapolis, Maryland.  After Chase's death, Mary Whetcroft married Philetus Allen of Springville.

Chase's children included Frank Chase (September 18, 1838—January 14, 1902), who was born the month following Chase's death.  Frank Chase was a graduate of Albany Law School, and resided in Concord and Springville.  In addition to practicing law, he was involved in local politics and government, including service as Springville's town supervisor and a justice of the peace.

References

Sources

Books

Newspapers

Internet

External links

Year of birth unknown
1838 deaths
National Republican Party members of the United States House of Representatives from New York (state)
People from Cooperstown, New York
People from Richfield, New York
19th-century American politicians
1789 births